Moody's Manual is a series of manuals published by the Moody's Corporation. It was first published in 1900 by John Moody, nine years before he founded Moody's. Initially called Moody's Manual of Industrial and Miscellaneous Securities, it was later superseded by Moody's Manual of Railroads and Corporation Securities, then by Moody's Analyses of Investments.

Selected historic publications 
Moody's Analyses of Railroad Investments; 

1st Year (1909)
 2nd Year (1910)
3rd Year (1912)

Moody's Analyses of Investments, Moody's Investors Service (1913–1919)

 Part I – Steam Railroads
4th Year (1913)
5th Year (1914)
6th Year (1915)
7th Year (1916)
8th Year (1917)
9th Year (1918)
10th Year (1919)

 Part II – Public Utilities and Industrials
5th Year (1914)
6th Year (1915)
7th Year (1916)
8th Year (1917)
9th Year (1918)
10th Year (1919)

 Part III – Government and Municipal Securities
10th Year (1919)

 Part I – Railroad Investments (industry name change)
11th Year (1920)

 Part II – Industrial Investments
11th Year (1920)
 12th Year (1921)

 Part III – Public Utility Investments
11th Year (1920)

 Part IV – Government and Municipal Securities
11th Year (1920)
13th Year (1922)

References

External links
 List of Moody's Manual publications

Investment
Publications established in 1900